A Tear in the Eye Is a Wound in the Heart is the second studio album released by Portland, Oregon-based string band Black Prairie. It was released on September 18, 2012.

Track listing

Personnel
The album was composed by Black Prairie.
 Hanz Araki 
 Paul Beck: Cymbalom
 Jenny Conlee: Piano, violin
 Chris Funk: Banjo, autoharp
 Tucker Martine: Producer
 John Moen: Percussion
 Jon Neufeld: Guitar, autoharp
 Andy Schichter: Assistant
 Roger Seibel: mastering
 Nate Query: Bass, cello
 Annalisa Tornfelt of Bearfoot: Vocals, violin

Chart performance
The album peaked at number 4 on the Billboard Top Bluegrass Albums chart.

Critical reception
Several have noted that the album is beautiful, noting the vocals of Annalisa Tornfelt from Bearfoot. Steve Leggett of Allmusic wrote that "this fine second album shows the growth, poise, and vision of a completely separate band. A lot of this is due to the beautifully nuanced vocals of Annalisa Tornfelt, whose hushed, unhurried, and wonderfully balanced singing makes songs here like "Rock of Ages" and "Nowhere, Massachusetts" sound ageless, comforting, and wise." Geoffrey Himes of The Washington Post described the album as "impressive" and that "Tornfelt’s cool soprano and minimalist lyrics rein in the band’s wilder impulses and focus the sound on her tales of disappointed lovers, revivifying nature and the suicide of the Band’s Richard Manuel."

References

External links

2012 albums
Black Prairie albums
Albums produced by Tucker Martine
Sugar Hill Records albums